John Vincent Lucey (1943 - 25 June 1999) was an Irish Gaelic footballer. He played at club level with Glenbeigh-Glencar, Laune Rangers and Mid Kerry and at inter-county level with the Kerry senior football team.

Career

Born in Caragh Lake, County Kerry, Lucey first played Gaelic football with Glenbeigh-Glencar before later joining the Laune Rangers club. He won a County Championship title with divisional side Mid Kerry in 1967. Lucey was a member of the Kerry team that won the Munster Vocational Schools' Championship in 1959 before later winning a Leinster Championship title with the Dublin minor team in 1961. He subsequently declared for his native county and was part of the Kerry under-21 team that won the inaugural All-Ireland Under-21 Championship title in 1964. Lucey followed his brothers Noel and Jimmy onto the Kerry senior football team and was at right wing-forward for Kerry's 1965 All-Ireland final defeat by Galway., having earlier won a Munster Championship title.

Personal life and death

Lucey, like his brothers, joined the Irish Air Corps and was stationed in Baldonnel Aerodrome.<He died after a long period of illness at Milford Hospice in Limerick on 25 June 1999.

Career statistics

Honours

Mid Kerry
Kerry Senior Football Championship: 1967

Dublin
Leinster Minor Football Championship: 1961

Kerry
Munster Senior Football Championship: 1965
All-Ireland Under-21 Football Championship: 1964
Munster Under-21 Football Championship: 1964

References

1943 births
1999 deaths
Glenbeigh-Glencar Gaelic footballers
Laune Rangers Gaelic footballers
Dublin inter-county Gaelic footballers
Kerry inter-county Gaelic footballers